A nave is the middle, center, or body of a church, or (etymologically unrelated) the hub of a wheel.

Nave or naves may also refer to:

Places
France
Nave (river), a river in Pas-de-Calais, France
Navès, Tarn, a commune in the Tarn department
Naves, Allier, a commune in the Allier department
Naves, Corrèze, a commune in the Corrèze department
Naves, Nord, a commune in the Nord department
Nâves-Parmelan, a commune in the Haute-Savoie department

Israel
Naveh, Israel, a moshav in southern Israel also transliterated as Nave

Italy
Nave, Lombardy, a comune in the Province of Brescia
Nave San Rocco, a comune in the Province of Trento, Trentino-Alto Adige/Südtirol

Portugal
Nave, Sabugal, a parish in the Municipality of Sabugal
Nave de Haver, a parish in the Municipality of Almeida
Naves, Almeida, a parish in the municipality of Almeida

Spain
Navès, Lleida, a municipality of province of Lleida, Catalonia
Naves, Llanes, a parish in the municipality of Llanes, Asturias
Naves, Oviedo, a parish in the municipality of Oviedo, Asturias

Other uses
Nave Espacial de Varginha, Brazilian tower
Naves (grape), a Spanish wine grape
Nave (surname)
Nave Nave Mahana, painting
La nave, an opera by Italian composer Italo Montemezzi
La Nave del Olvido, album